Denmark competed at the 1988 Winter Paralympics in held in Innsbruck, Austria. Three competitors from Denmark did not win any medals and so finished last in the medal table. Two athletes competed in alpine skiing and one athlete competed in cross-country skiing.

Alpine skiing 

Hans Ole Nielsen competed in the following events:

 Men's Downhill B1 (finished in 6th place)
 Men's Giant Slalom B1 (did not finish)

Lars Nielsen competed in the following events:

 Men's Downhill B2 (finished in 5th place)
 Men's Giant Slalom B2 (finished in 5th place)

Cross-country 

Arne Christensen competed in cross-country skiing in the following events:

 Men's Short Distance 15 km B1 (finished in 13th place)
 Men's Long Distance 30 km B1 (finished in 15th place)

See also 

 Denmark at the Paralympics
 Denmark at the 1988 Summer Paralympics

References 

Denmark at the Paralympics
1988 in Danish sport
Nations at the 1988 Winter Paralympics